Moses Inwang (born 31 January 1978) is a Nigerian film director, producer, editor and screenwriter best known for classic films in the Nollywood mainstream that speak to societal ills and nagging live issues rarely documented in Nigerian movies. Inwang's first outstanding recognition came in 2012 when he directed the psychological thriller Torn, ⁣ also produced by him, and released in cinemas nationwide in 2013. With multiple nominations, award and recognition bagged from that movie, he went on to direct and produce other hits like Damage, Cold Feet, Stalker, Last 3 digits, Alter Ego, Crazy People, American Driver, Unroyal and lastly Merry Men 2; Ayo Makun (AY)’s blockbuster film, which emerged the 2nd highest-grossing movie of 2019 in Nigeria with a sum of 240 million.

With a career spanning over two decades, Sneezemankind as he is popularly addressed got his first film credit in 1998 when he co-produced Two Good Men. By 2004 he started his production company, Sneeze Films and kicked off with the film Save My Soul. 2008 however saw him directing the film, Lost Maiden, ⁣ a film which brought the controversial issue of female circumcision to the fore, headlining social discussion. He further went on to make Save Our Souls, an educative film about cancer. He also directed and co-produced Damage in 2011, addressing the issue of domestic violence, a film that received multiple nominations and carted away awards in Florida, USA.

Education
Inwang attended Obafemi Awolowo University.

Career
Inwang came into the spotlight and quickly gained critical recognition for directing the psychological thriller, Torn which he produced and released in cinemas nationwide. The film earned him multiple award nominations and recognition locally and on the global stage. However, his career took a dive in the right direction after being contracted to direct Merry Men 2, a film produced by Ayo Makun (A.Y) of Coperate World Entertainment which emerged as the 2nd highest-grossing film of 2019.

Personal life
Inwang is the surviving male child in a family of six, after losing his brother at a young age.

Professional life
In 2004, he started his production company Sneeze Films and kicked off with the film Save My Soul. In 2008, he directed the film, Lost Maiden, a film which brought the issue of female circumcision to the fore of social discussion. He also made Save Our Souls, an educative film about cancer. He also directed and co-produced Damage in 2011, a film which addressed the issue of domestic violence, receiving multiple awards and award nominations.

The psychological thriller Torn which he produced in 2012 and which was released in cinemas nationwide in 2013, earned him and most of the actors who starred in it a lot of award nominations and recognition. In 2012, his film Damage earned Inwang the nomination for best director at the African Oscars held in Florida USA, ⁣ while the film won the award for Best Film at the African Oscars Awards. In 2013, he won the City People Award for Best Director. His 2013 film Torn received 9 nominations at the GIAMA awards in Houston, Texas and 6 nominations at the Best Of Nollywood Awards. In 2014 he went on record as the first Director in Nollywood to receive two nomination as best director at the Nollywood Movies Awards.

His movie, The Last 3 Digits was nominated for best comedy at the African Movie Academy Awards AMAA in 2015 and was also chosen amongst the few selected Nollywood films that were screened to thousands of people at the Nollywood Week Paris. His movie Stalker, a romantic drama which premiered in Nigeria on 26 February 2016, received 10 nominations and won 3 awards at the 2015 Golden Icons Academy Movie Awards in the United States.

In 2015 STALKER, another film written, produced and directed by Moses Inwang, raked in 12 nominations at the GIAMA awards Houston and won awards for Best Actor, Best actress and Best Film categories. Still in 2015 Stalker won the award for Best International Film at the New York film Festival. In 2017 his film American Driver from his production company Sneeze Films received the best comedy Award at The Peoples Film Festival, Harlem New York. American Driver was also nominated for "Comedy of the Year" at the 2017 Best of Nollywood Awards.

In 2017, another blockbuster, Alter Ego, which was produced and directed by Moses Inwang starring Omotola Jalade, was released to a highly-anticipating audience in the Nigerian cinemas and immediately became the most talked about film of the year.  Alter Ego clinched the award for The Most Outstanding Film at the Africa International Film Festival AFRIFF. It also won Moses Inwang the Best Director award at the Toronto International Nollywood Film Festival and Best Screenplay award at the Africa Magic Viewers Choice Awards AMVCA with the film getting nine nominations. It was given the best international film award at The Peoples Film Festival NY.

In 2018, Moses Inwang produced the film Crazy People which went on to become one of the top 10 highest-grossing films of that year. The prolific filmmaker has also released yet another impressive, romantic drama film titled Cold Feet.

By late 2019, Moses was contracted by A.Y's Corporate World Entertainment to direct the blockbuster and multiple award-winning film, Merry Men, and the sequel Merry Men, 2 went on to emerge the 2nd highest-grossing film at the box office by the end of 2019 with a sum of 240 million.

Awards & nominations

Filmography
Feature Films

See also
 List of Nigerian film producers

References

External links

Moses Inwang at LinkedIn

1978 births
Living people
Filmmakers from Lagos
Nigerian film directors
Nigerian screenwriters
Nigerian editors
Nigerian film producers